Adeeb Al-Haizan (born 3 May 2001) is a Saudi Arabian professional footballer who plays as a forward for Al-Orobah on loan from Al-Tai.

Club career
Al-Haizan started his career at Al-Qala before moving to Al-Tai in 2020. He made his first-team after the season resumed after COVID-19 pandemic during the 2019–20 season. He scored his first goal for the club on 16 December 2020 in the 2–0 win against Al-Shoulla. He made 9 appearances and scored once during the 2020–21 season as Al-Tai earned promotion to the Pro League for the first time since 2008. He made his Pro League debut on 31 December 2021 in the 0–1 win against Al-Hazem. On 1 September 2022, Al-Haizan joined Al-Orobah on loan.

References

External links
 
 

2001 births
Living people
Saudi Arabian footballers
Association football forwards
Saudi Fourth Division players
Saudi First Division League players
Saudi Professional League players
Al-Qala Club players
Al-Tai FC players
Al-Orobah FC players